The 2011 Katsina State gubernatorial election occurred on 26 April 2011. PDP candidate Ibrahim Shema won the election, defeating CPC Aminu Bello Masari and 8 other candidates.

Ibrahim Shema emerged PDP's candidate in the primary election. He picked Abdullahi Faskari as his running mate.

Aminu Bello Masari was CPC candidate, Usman Mohammad Bugaje was ACN candidate. Hasimu Lawal Jobe was ANPP candidate.

Results
Ibrahim Shema from the PDP won the election defeating other 9 candidates.

The total number of registered voters in the state was 3,126,898, valid votes was 1,622,063.

Ibrahim Shema, (PDP)- 1,029,912

Aminu Bello Masari, CPC- 555,769

Usman Mohammad Bugaje, ACN- 19,990

Sani Sani, MPPP- 4,609

Hasimu Lawal Jobe, ANPP- 3,574

Shehu Isa Kaita, PRP- 2,589

Muktari Shehu Nasir, APS- 2,192

Amanu Dahiru Kasauri, APGA- 1,319

Ibrahim Abu Musawa, LP- 1,146

Lawal Musa Bindawa, ACPN- 963

References 

Katsina State gubernatorial elections
Katsina State gubernatorial election
Katsina State gubernatorial election